William Lawton may refer to:

 William Stevens Lawton (1900–1993), United States Army general
 William Cranston Lawton (1853–1941), American author and educator
 Bill Lawton (1920–2008), English cricketer